Sacajawea Peaks is a summit in the U.S. states of Montana and Idaho.

The peaks were named for Sacajawea, an Indian guide on the Lewis and Clark Expedition.

References

Mountains of Montana
Mountains of Beaverhead County, Montana
Mountains of Idaho
Mountains of Lemhi County, Idaho